The Corlat is a right tributary of the river Olt in Romania. It flows into the Olt near Arini.

References

Rivers of Romania
Rivers of Covasna County
Rivers of Brașov County